Elections are held in Riverside, California to elect the city's mayor. Currently, such elections are nonpartisan and are regularly scheduled to elect mayors to four-year terms.

Elections before 1997

1997

The 1997 Riverside, California mayoral election was held on November 4, 1997 to elect the mayor of Riverside, California. It saw the reelection of Ronald O. Loveridge.

Candidates
Terry Frizzel, businesswoman and former mayor of Riverside (1990-1994)
Gary R. Supek, quality analyst
Ronald O. Loveridge, incumbent mayor and college teacher
Steven Portillo Torres, "politicalist", speaker, and collegiate

Results

2001

The 2001 Riverside, California mayoral election was held on November 6, 2001 to elect the mayor of Riverside, California. It saw the reelection of Ronald O. Loveridge to a third term.

Candidates
Sam Cardelucci, owner of National Environmental Waste Co.
Ronald O. Loveridge, incumbent mayor and college teacher
Letitia Pepper, attorney and teacher
Peter G. Weber, manufacturing manager

Results

2005

The 2005 Riverside, California mayoral election was held on November 8, 2005 to elect the mayor of Riverside, California. It saw the reelection of Ronald O. Loveridge to a fourth term.

Candidates
Terry Frizzel, former mayor of Riverside (1990-1994)
Ronald O. Loveridge, incumbent mayor and college teacher
Ameal Moore

Results

2009

The 2009 Riverside, California mayoral election was held on November 3, 2009 to elect the mayor of Riverside, California. It saw the reelection of Ronald O. Loveridge to a fifth term.

Results

2012

The 2012 Riverside, California mayoral election was held on April 9, 2012 and June 5, 2012 and November 6, 2012 to elect the mayor of Riverside, California. It saw the election of Rusty Bailey.

Incumbent mayor Ronald Loveridge opted against running for a sixth term.

Results
First round
 

10112 

Runoff

2016

The 2016 Riverside, California mayoral election was held on June 7, 2016 to elect the mayor of Riverside, California. It saw the reelection of Rusty Bailey.

Because Bailey won a majority in the initial round of the election, no runoff was needed.

Results

2020

The 2020 Riverside, California mayoral election was held on March 3, 2020 to elect the mayor of Riverside, California. It saw the election of Patricia Lock Dawson.

Results
First round
 

Runoff

References 

 
2020 United States mayoral elections